In mythology of Andean civilizations of South America, the amaru or katari (aymara) is a mythical serpent or dragon.  In Inca mythology, amaru is a huge double-headed serpent that dwells underground, at the bottom of lakes and rivers.  Illustrated with the heads of a bird and a puma, amaruca can be seen emerging from a central element in the center of a stepped mountain or pyramid motif in the Gateway of the Sun at Tiwanaku, Bolivia. When illustrated on religious vessels, amaruca is often seen with bird-like feet and wings, so that it resembles a dragon. Amaruca is believed capable of transcending boundaries to and from the spiritual realm of the subterranean world.

See also
List of dragons in mythology and folklore
Religion in the Inca Empire
Túpac Amaru

References

Inca mythology
Dragons
Quechua legendary creatures
Peruvian folklore